Peter Kažimír (born 28 June 1968 in Košice, Czechoslovakia)) is a Slovak central banker and former politician, currently serving as the Governor of the National Bank of Slovakia (NBS). He previously served as the country's Finance Minister under prime ministers Robert Fico and Peter Pellegrini. He was a senior member of the social-democratic SMER-SD party, but left the party after assuming the governorship of NBS.

Early life
Peter Kažimír studied International Commerce at the University of Economics in Bratislava. After graduation, he worked in the private sector as a tax advisor at the firm Schubert & partners. Since early 2000s, he held board-level executive positions at various companies, including VIVANT, Sceptrum Brno, PARTA – GAS, MATTI and DDP Credit Suisse Life & Pensions.

Political career

State Secretary and MP
In 2006 Kažimír became the State Secretary at the Ministry of Finance. At the same time, he sat on the board of National Nuclear Fund for Decommissioning of Nuclear Installations (NJF). Following the defeat of Direction-Social Democracy (SMER-SD) in 2010 Slovak parliamentary election, Kažimír shortly served as MP. After 2012 Slovak parliamentary election when SMER-SD returned to power, Kažimír became the Minister of Finance.

Minister of Finance
In 2015, Kažimír was part of a team that secured the investment of Jaguar Land Rover in a £1bn plant, beating off stiff competition from Poland and Mexico. In the second half of 2016, during Slovakia's Presidency of the Council of the European Union, he officially represented the EU and the Eurogroup at the G20 and G7 meetings as well as the annual meeting of the International Monetary Fund (IMF).

According to the Financial Times, Kažimír developed a strong record on managing Slovakia's public finances since taking office. He earned respect for keeping budget deficits under control and became known for his tough stance in the eurozone’s negotiations with debt-plagued Greece.

By November 2017, Kažimír submitted his formal application for succeeding Jeroen Dijsselbloem as the next chairman of the Eurogroup. At the vote on December 4, he withdrew after the first round and Mário Centeno was eventually elected to the post.

As the Minister of Finance, Kažimír sat Ex-Officio on the board of the European Investment Bank.

Central Bank Governorship
In December 2019, the National Council approved Kažimír as the government's nominee to succeed Jozef Makúch in the office of the president of the National Bank of Slovakia. He took up the post on 1 June 2019. As a Governor of a Eurozone Central Bank, Kažimír sits Ex-Officio on the boards of the European Central Bank and the European Systemic Risk Board.

International organizations
 European Bank for Reconstruction and Development (EBRD), Ex-Officio Member of the Board of Governors (2012-2019)
 Multilateral Investment Guarantee Agency (MIGA), World Bank Group, Ex-Officio Member of the Board of Governors (2012-2019)
 World Bank, Ex-Officio Member of the Board of Governors (2012-2019)

Personal life
Since 2008 Kažimír lives with Katarína Korecká. They have two children together. He is protective of his private life.

References

External links

 CV of Peter Kazimir, Slovak Ministry of Finance, Bratislava, Retrieved on March 24, 2013.
Na Telo Program Na Telo, TV Markiza "Za Fica bol plyn skoro zdarma, ale len podla popletenej statistiky" , TV Markiza, Bratislava, April 13, 2011. Retrieved on March 24, 2013

1968 births
Finance ministers of Slovakia
Governors of the National Bank of Slovakia
Living people
Direction – Social Democracy politicians
Politicians from Košice
Members of the National Council (Slovakia) 2010-2012